Arses may refer to:
 Arses of Persia, king of Persia between 338 BC and 336 BC
 Arses (bird), a genus of monarch flycatchers (birds)
 Plural of arsis (a poetry metrical term)
 Plural of arse